Pirie is a surname.

Pirie may also refer to:

 Pirie Peninsula, Laurie Island, British Antarctic Territory
 Pirie Street, Adelaide, South Australia
 HMAS Pirie (J189), a Royal Australian Navy Second World War corvette
 HMAS Pirie (ACPB 87), a patrol boat
 Karen Pirie, a fictional Scottish detective created by Val McDermid

See also 
 Port Pirie (disambiguation), articles associated with the city in South Australia
 Piri (disambiguation)